Dewey Dallas Martin (December 8, 1923 – March 11 or April 9, 2018) was an American film and television actor.

Early life
Martin was born in Katemcy, Texas. As a teenager, he lived in Florence, Alabama.

Martin joined the United States Navy in 1940. In November 1942, he was one of a few enlisted sailors from Naval Air Technical Training Center Norman, Oklahoma selected for pre-flight training with the opportunity to earn a commission as an officer and become a naval aviator. In April 1943, he was transferred to pre-flight training at the CAA War Training Service School in Natchitoches, Louisiana. At the time of his transfer, he was an Aviation Metalsmith 2nd Class and served as the Aviation Metalsmith School storekeeper. In November 1943, he was transferred to Navy-Preflight School in Athens, Georgia. In June 1944, he was assigned to at Naval Air Station Pensacola, Florida after completing primary flight training in Dallas, Texas. He served as a fighter pilot in the Pacific Theater of the war.

Acting career
His film debut was an uncredited part in Knock on Any Door (1949), starring Humphrey Bogart. He also appeared in The Thing from Another World (1951), co-starred with Kirk Douglas in The Big Sky (1952), and reuniting again with Humphrey Bogart as his younger escape convict brother in The Desperate Hours. Martin also played a lead role in Land of the Pharaohs (1955), and was featured opposite Dean Martin in Dean’s first post-Martin and Lewis filmTen Thousand Bedrooms (1957) but did not become a full-fledged star.

Martin worked extensively in television as well, including The Twilight Zone episode "I Shot an Arrow Into the Air" (1960) and The Outer Limits episode "The Premonition" (1965), co-written by Ib Melchior. Starting in 1960, he played Daniel Boone on four episodes of Walt Disney Presents.

Personal life
Martin married Mardie Havelhurst from Portland, Oregon on February 15, 1952. They were divorced in 1955. He was later married to singer Peggy Lee for two years; the marriage ended in divorce.

His first cousin was Ross Bass, a senator from Tennessee. Martin supported Adlai Stevenson during the 1952 United States presidential election.

Complete filmography

Knock on Any Door (1949) - Butch (uncredited)
Battleground (1949) - G.I. Straggler (uncredited)
The Golden Gloves Story (1950) - Nick Martel
Kansas Raiders (1950) - James Younger
The Thing from Another World (1951) - Crew Chief Bob
Flame of Araby (1951) - Yak
The Big Sky (1952) - Boone Caudill
Tennessee Champ (1954) - Daniel Norson
Prisoner of War (1954) - Jesse Treadman
Men of the Fighting Lady (1954) - Ensign Kenneth Schechter
Land of the Pharaohs (1955) - Senta, Vashtar's Son
The Desperate Hours (1955) - Hal Griffin
Meet Me in Las Vegas (1956) - Dewey Martin (uncredited)
The Proud and Profane (1956) - Eddie Wodcik
Ten Thousand Bedrooms (1957) - Mike Clark Jr.
The Longest Day (1962) - Private Wilder (scenes deleted)
Savage Sam (1963) - Lester White
Flight to Fury (1964) - Joe Gaines
Cordillera (1964) (Tagalog version of Flight to Fury)
Assault on the Wayne (1971, TV Movie) - Skip Langley
Seven Alone (1974) - Henry Sager

Television roles
Cavalry Patrol (1956, TV pilot) - Lt. Johnny Reardon
Zane Gray Theatre episode Man of Fear (1958) – Doc Holliday
The Twilight Zone episode "I Shot an Arrow Into the Air" (1960) - Corey
Walt Disney Presents - "Daniel Boone" mini-series (1960-1961) - Daniel Boone
Man on the Beach (1961, TV pilot) - Detective 
The Outer Limits episode "The Premonition" (1965) - Jim Darcy
Laramie episode "The Stranger" (1963) – Vanton Maddox
Wheeler and Murdoch (1972, TV pilot) - Travanty
Mission Impossible (1972) - Mike Clark Jr. Episode: "Leona"

References

External links

1923 births
2018 deaths
20th-century American male actors
Alabama Democrats
American male film actors
American male television actors
California Democrats
Male actors from Alabama
Male actors from Texas
Military personnel from Alabama
Military personnel from Texas
People from Florence, Alabama
People from Mason County, Texas
Texas Democrats
United States Naval Aviators
United States Navy officers
United States Navy pilots of World War II